More Than You Know is an album by saxophonist Dexter Gordon with an Orchestra arranged and conducted by Palle Mikkelborg recorded in 1975 and released on the Danish SteepleChase label.

Reception 

In his review for AllMusic, Scott Yanow said "This set does not quite live up to its potential although Dexter Gordon fans will still find moments to enjoy".

Track listing 
All compositions by Dexter Gordon except where noted.
 "Naima" (John Coltrane) – 6:45
 "Good Morning Sun" (Palle Mikkelborg) – 11:38
 "The Girl With the Purple Eyes" – 5:59
 "This Happy Madness" (Antônio Carlos Jobim, Vinícius de Moraes) – 6:33 Bonus track on CD release
 "Ernie's Tune" – 9:47
 "Tivoli" – 7:03
 "More Than You Know" (Vincent Youmans, Edward Eliscu, Billy Rose) – 7:35

Personnel 
Dexter Gordon – tenor saxophone, soprano saxophone, vocals
Allan Botschinsky (tracks 1, 2 & 4–7), Benny Rosenfeld (tracks 1, 2 & 4–7), Idrees Sulieman – trumpet
Richard Boone (tracks 1, 2 & 4–7), Vincent Nilsson – trombone
Axel Windfeld – bass trombone (tracks 1, 2 & 4–7)
Preben Garnov – French horn (tracks 1, 2 & 4–7)
Bent Larsen – alto saxophone, bass flute (tracks 1, 2 & 4–7)
Erwin Jacobsen – English horn, oboe (tracks 1, 2 & 4–7)
Age Knudsen, Mogens Holm Larsen, Per Walther – violin (tracks 1, 2 & 4–7)
Bjarne Boie Rasmussen – viola (tracks 1, 2 & 4–7)
Erling Christensen – cello (tracks 1, 2 & 4–7)
Luba Boschenko – harp (tracks 1, 2 & 4–7)
Thomas Clausen – piano, electric piano
Kenneth Knudsen – synthesizer
Ole Molin – guitar
Niels-Henning Ørsted Pedersen – bass
Alex Riel (track 3), Ed Thigpen (tracks 1, 2 & 4–7) – drums
Klaus Nordsoe – congas, percussion
Sanne Salomonsen – vocals (track 2)
Palle Mikkelborg – arranger, conductor, trumpet, vocals

References 

1975 albums
Dexter Gordon albums
SteepleChase Records albums